The Brown River tree frog (Litoria vocivincens) is a species of frog in the subfamily Pelodryadinae. It is endemic to Papua New Guinea. Its natural habitats are subtropical or tropical moist lowland forests, swamps, intermittent freshwater marshes, and rural gardens.

References

Litoria
Amphibians of Papua New Guinea
Amphibians described in 1972
Taxonomy articles created by Polbot